Robert John William Sykes (born September 26, 1951) is a Canadian former professional ice hockey player who played two games in the National Hockey League with the Toronto Maple Leafs during the 1974–75 season. The rest of his career, which lasted from 1973 to 1977, was spent in the minor leagues.

Career statistics

Regular season and playoffs

References

1951 births
Living people
Canadian ice hockey left wingers
Ice hockey people from Ontario
Oklahoma City Blazers (1965–1977) players
Ontario Hockey Association Senior A League (1890–1979) players
Saginaw Gears players
Saint Louis Billikens men's ice hockey players
Sportspeople from Greater Sudbury
Toronto Maple Leafs draft picks
Toronto Maple Leafs players